Hans Reiter may refer to

 Hans Reiter (physician) (1881–1969), German Nazi physician, head of the German Office of Public Health from 1933 to 1945
 Hans J. Reiter (1921–1992), Austrian mathematician
 Hans Reiter (sailor), competed in the Tornado sailing race at the 1988 Summer Olympics